Proof most often refers to:

 Proof (truth), argument or sufficient evidence for the truth of a proposition
 Alcohol proof, a measure of an alcoholic drink's strength
Proof may also refer to:

Mathematics and formal logic
 Formal proof, a construct in proof theory
 Mathematical proof, a convincing demonstration that some mathematical statement is necessarily true
 Proof complexity, computational resources required to prove statements
 Proof procedure, method for producing proofs in proof theory
 Proof theory, a branch of mathematical logic that represents proofs as formal mathematical objects
 Statistical proof, demonstration of degree of certainty for a hypothesis

Law and philosophy
 Evidence, information which tends to determine or demonstrate the truth of a proposition
 Evidence (law), tested evidence or a legal proof
 Legal burden of proof, duty to establish the truth of facts in a trial
 Philosophic burden of proof, obligation on a party in a dispute to provide sufficient warrant for their position

Manufacturing and printing
 Artist's proof, a single print taken during the printmaking process
 Galley proof, a preliminary version of a publication
 Prepress proof, a facsimile of press artwork for job verification 
 Proof coinage, coins once made as a test, but now specially struck for collectors
 Proof of concept, demonstration that a concept has practical potential
 Proof test, stress test of structures such as vessels and weapons
 Proofreading, reviewing a manuscript for errors or improvements

People
 Proof (rapper) (1973–2006), American rapper and member of D12
 Sam Proof (born 1974), U.S. actor

Places
 Proof School, San Francisco, California, USA; a secondary school

Arts and entertainment and media

Film, television, and theatre
 Proof (play), a 2000 play by David Auburn

Film
 Proof, a 1980 student film by Kevin Reynolds, expanded to Fandango
 Proof (1991 film), an Australian film by Jocelyn Moorhouse
 Proof (2005 film), a film by John Madden, based on the 2000 play by David Auburn

Television
 Proof (2004 TV series), an Irish drama/thriller
 Proof (2015 TV series), an American medical/supernatural drama
 "Proof" (Devious Maids), a television episode

Literature
 Proof (comics), a comic series from Image Comics
 "Proof", a 1942 science fiction short story by Hal Clement
 PROOF!, a magazine published by Lynne McTaggart

Music

Albums and records
 Proof, an album by Emily Elbert, 2010
 Proof, an EP by Colour Coding, 2012
 Proof (album), an anthology album by BTS, 2022

Songs and singles
 "Proof" (I Am Kloot song), 2003
 "Proof" (Paul Simon song), 1991
 "Proof"/"No Vain", a single by Mell, 2007
 "Proof", a song by Angela, 2004
 "Proof", a song by Chris Brown from Royalty, 2015
 "Proof", a song by Coldplay, a B-side of the single "Speed of Sound", 2005
 "Proof", a song by Happy Rhodes from Many Worlds Are Born Tonight, 1998
 "Proof", a song by Paramore from Paramore, 2013

See also

 Proofing (disambiguation)
 Provability (disambiguation)
 Homeopathic proving, a homeopathic procedure
 
 Proof Positive (disambiguation)
 Living Proof (disambiguation)
 Fool proof (disambiguation)
 100 Proof (disambiguation)